SKJ may refer to:

 League of Communists of Yugoslavia (Serbo-Croatian: Savez komunista Jugoslavije)
 Skj (trigraph), used to represent the voiceless postalveolar fricative , in the Norwegian and Faroese languages
 Thakali language, ISO-639 language code